Reinking is a surname, and may refer to:

 Ann Reinking (1949–2020), American actress, dancer, and choreographer
 David Reinking, American literacy researcher
 Megan Reinking (born 1981), American stage and television actress
 Nate Reinking (born 1973), American-British basketball player and coach

See also
 Inking (disambiguation)

Surnames from given names